Ong Ewe Chye (born 01 June 1965) is a former badminton player from Malaysia. He is the elder brother of Ong Ewe Hock.

Achievements

Asian Championships 
Men's doubles

Asian Cup 
Mixed doubles

Southeast Asian Games 
Men's doubles

Mixed doubles

IBF World Grand Prix 
The World Badminton Grand Prix sanctioned by International Badminton Federation (IBF) from 1983 to 2006.

Men's doubles

References

1965 births
Living people
People from Penang
Malaysian sportspeople of Chinese descent
Sportspeople from Penang
Malaysian male badminton players
Southeast Asian Games medalists in badminton
Southeast Asian Games gold medalists for Malaysia
Southeast Asian Games bronze medalists for Malaysia
Competitors at the 1987 Southeast Asian Games
Competitors at the 1991 Southeast Asian Games
20th-century Malaysian people